Rasos can refer to:

 Rasos (district), a district in Vilnius, capital of Lithuania
 Rasos Cemetery, the oldest cemetery in Vilnius
 Saint Jonas' Festival, a Lithuanian festival during the summer solstice